John Hibbard (7 September 1863 – 17 October 1905) was an English cricketer. He played four first-class matches for Kent in 1893.

References

External links
 

1863 births
1905 deaths
English cricketers
Kent cricketers
Sportspeople from Kent